Radoslav Zlatanov (born 14 December 1987) is a visually impaired Bulgarian track and field athlete. Competing in the T13 classification, Zlatanov has competed at two Summer Paralympic Games, winning a bronze in the long jump at the 2012 Games in London. He is also a multiple World and European Championships winner, taking seven medals over seven tournaments in both long jump and sprint events.

References 

1987 births
Living people
People from Veliko Tarnovo
Bulgarian male sprinters
Bulgarian male long jumpers
Paralympic athletes of Bulgaria
Athletes (track and field) at the 2008 Summer Paralympics
Athletes (track and field) at the 2012 Summer Paralympics
Paralympic bronze medalists for Bulgaria
Medalists at the 2012 Summer Paralympics
Medalists at the World Para Athletics Championships
Medalists at the World Para Athletics European Championships
Paralympic medalists in athletics (track and field)
Sportspeople from Veliko Tarnovo Province
Visually impaired sprinters
Visually impaired long jumpers
Paralympic sprinters
Paralympic long jumpers
21st-century Bulgarian people
Bulgarian blind people